is a former Japanese football player.

Playing career
Sakai was born in Konan on June 28, 1985. After graduating from high school, he joined J1 League club Albirex Niigata in 2004. In June, he moved to Albirex Niigata Singapore. He backed to Albirex Niigata in 2006 season.

References

1985 births
Living people
Association football people from Shiga Prefecture
Japanese footballers
J1 League players
Albirex Niigata players
Association football defenders